Hypena heuloa is a species of moth in the family Erebidae. It is found in North America.

The MONA or Hodges number for Hypena heuloa is 8449.

References

Further reading

 
 
 

heuloa
Articles created by Qbugbot
Moths described in 1905